George Metropoulos (born March 15, 1896, date of death unknown) was an American wrestler. He competed in the Greco-Roman lightweight and the freestyle lightweight events at the 1920 Summer Olympics.

References

External links
 

1896 births
Year of death missing
Greek emigrants to the United States
Olympic wrestlers of the United States
Wrestlers at the 1920 Summer Olympics
American male sport wrestlers
Place of birth missing